Bacharach (also known as Bacharach am Rhein) is a town in the Mainz-Bingen district in Rhineland-Palatinate, Germany. It belongs to the Verbandsgemeinde of Rhein-Nahe, whose seat is in Bingen am Rhein, although that town is not within its bounds.

The original name Baccaracus suggests a Celtic origin. Above the town stands Stahleck Castle (Burg Stahleck), now a youth hostel.

Geography

Location 
The town lies in the Rhine Gorge, 48 km south of Koblenz.

Constituent communities 
Bacharach is divided into several Ortsteile. The outlying centre of Steeg lies in the Steeg Valley (Steeger Tal) off to the side, away from the Rhine. This glen lies between Medenscheid and Neurath to the south and Henschhausen to the north on the heights.

History 
In the early 11th century, Bacharach had its first documentary mention. It may have been that as early as the 7th century, the kingly domain passed into Archbishop of Cologne Kunibert’s ownership; pointing to this is a Kunibertskapelle (chapel) on the spot where now stands the Wernerkapelle. The Vögte of the Cologne estate were the Elector of the Palatinate, who over time pushed back Cologne’s influence. Count Palatine already had so much influence that he resided at Stahleck Castle. His successor Konrad von Staufen’s daughter secretly wed at Stahleck Castle a son of the Welfs, who were family foes, leading to Bacharach’s, and indeed the whole County Palatine’s, falling for a short time to Henry of Brunswick. In 1214 the Wittelsbachs became Bacharach’s new lords. Together with the Unteramt of Kaub they received here their most important toll and revenue source. In 1314 it was decided to choose Louis the Bavarian as the German king. Furthermore, Bacharach was the most important transfer point for the wine trade, as barrels were offloaded here from the smaller ships that were needed to get by the Binger Loch (a quartzite reef in the Rhine upstream near Bingen) and loaded onto bigger ones. From then on, the wine bore the designation Bacharacher. The timber trade from the Hunsrück also brought Bacharach importance, and in 1356, Bacharach was granted town rights.

Widely visible is the Wernerkapelle, a Rheinromantik landmark of the town, lying on the way up to Stahleck Castle from the town. It is the expanded Kunibertkapelle, and is still an unfinished Gothic ruin today. Its namesake is Werner of Oberwesel, known in connection with pogroms triggered by his death. According to the Christian blood libel, which was typical of the times, a 16-year-old Werner was murdered on Maundy Thursday 1287 by members of the local Jewish community, who then used his blood for Passover observances. On the grounds of this alleged ritual murder, there arose an anti-Semitic mob who waged a pogrom, wiping out Jewish communities in the Middle and Lower Rhine and Moselle regions. In folk Christianity arose the cult of Werner, which was only stricken from the Bishopric of Trier calendar in 1963.

In 1344, building work began on the town wall, and was already finished about 1400. In 1545, the town, along with the Palatinate, became Protestant under Count Palatine Friedrich II. Stahleck Castle and the town wall could not stop Bacharach from undergoing eight changes in military occupation in the Thirty Years' War, nor the war’s attendant sackings. Moreover, further destruction was wrought by several town fires. Then, in 1689, French troops fighting in the Nine Years' War blew Stahleck Castle and four of the town wall’s towers up.

In 1794, French Revolutionary troops occupied the Rhine’s left bank and in 1802, Bacharach became temporarily French. During the War of the Sixth Coalition the Prussian Field Marshal Blücher, after crossing the Rhine near Kaub, came through Bacharach and the Steeg Valley on New Year’s Night 1813-1814 with his troops on the way to France. Recalling this event is a monument stone somewhat downstream, across from Kaub. After the Congress of Vienna, the town went, along with the Rhine’s left bank, up to and including Bingerbrück, to Prussia. After the harbour silted up, Bacharach fell into a slumber from which it only awoke in the course of the Rheinromantik. Among the first of the prominent visitors at this time was the French writer Victor Hugo.

Caring for and maintaining Bacharach’s building monuments, spurred on in the early 20th century by the Rhenish Association for Monument Care and Landscape Preservation (Rheinischer Verein für Denkmalpflege und Landschaftsschutz) which took on the then highly endangered town wall and Stahleck Castle ruin jobs, and the great dedication of the state of Rhineland-Palatinate to the Wernerkapelle have seen to it that Bacharach is still a jewel of the Rheinromantik and a multifaceted documentary site of mediaeval architecture on the Middle Rhine. The Wernerkapelle ruin is under monumental protection and before it a plaque has been placed recalling the inhuman crimes against Jewish residents and also containing a quotation from a prayer by Pope John XXIII for a change in Christians’ thinking in their relationship with the Jews:

“We recognize today that many centuries of blindness have shrouded our eyes, so that we no longer saw the goodliness of Thy Chosen People and no longer recognized our firstborn brother’s traits. We discover now that a mark of Cain stands on our forehead. In the course of the centuries our brother Abel has lain in blood that we spilt, and he has wept tears that we brought forth, because we forgot Thy love. Forgive us the curse that we unrightfully affixed to the Jews’ name. Forgive us for nailing Thee in their flesh for a second time to the Cross. For we knew not what we did........."

Today Bacharach thrives on tourism and wine from Bacharach is still enjoying international popularity. Not to be overlooked, however, are problems arising from a shrinking population, itself brought about by a lack of prospects.

Amalgamations 
On 7 June 1969, the formerly self-administering municipality of Steeg was amalgamated with Bacharach.

Town partnerships 
 Overijse, Flemish Brabant, Belgium
 Santenay, Côte-d'Or, France

Coat of arms 
The town’s arms might be described thus: Per fess at the nombril point sable a lion rampant Or armed, langued and crowned gules, and bendy lozengy argent and azure.

Population development
The number 1871-1987 are census results

Economy and infrastructure

Transport 
Bacharach lies on the Rhine’s left bank and can be reached by Bundesstraße 9 or the Rhine. Running regularly to and from Bacharach are the excursion ships of the Köln-Düsseldorfer-Rheinschiffahrt, or KD for short.

Transport routes on the other side of the river can be reached by ferry from the Engelsburg (castle) over to Kaub.

The town belongs to the Rhein-Nahe-Nahverkehrsverbund – a local transport association. Bacharach lies on the West Rhine Railway and is served by Cologne - Koblenz—Boppard—Bacharach—Bingen am Rhein—Mainz Regionalbahn trains (as of August 2022).

Culture and sightseeing

Timber-frame houses, which can be found throughout the town. A whole row of them borders Bacharach along with the town wall along the Rhine.
Altes Haus (“Old House”), mediaeval timber-frame house from 1368
Haus Utsch from 1585; in its time, Friedrich Wilhelm Utsch, the Jäger aus Kurpfalz (“Hunter from the Electorate of the Palatinate” – a character in a well known song) lived there.
Old postal station
Old marketplace
Electorate of the Palatinate Amt wine cellar
Former Electorate of the Palatinate mint
Toll yard with Saint Nicholas’s Catholic Church
Saint Peter’s Evangelical Church
Ruin of the Gothic Wernerkapelle
Saint Joseph's Catholic Chapel
Town wall ringing Bacharach, parts of which may be visited
Town wall towers: Diebesturm (“Thief’s Tower”, remnants), Zehnt-turm (“Tithe Tower”), Spitzenturm (“Pointed Tower”, remnants), Postenturm (“Post Tower”), Holztor (“Wooden Gate”, also called Steeger Tor), Liebesturm (“Love Tower”), Halbturm (“Half Tower”, remnants), Kühlbergturm (“Kühlberg Tower”, remnants), Sonnenturm (“Sun Tower”, remnants), Hutturm (“Hat Tower”), Zollturm (no longer existing), Kranentor, Markttor (“Market Gate”), Münztor (“Mint Gate”), Winandturm (“Winand’s Tower”). The town fortifications are among the best preserved in Rhineland-Palatinate.
Island in the Rhine, the Bacharacher Werth.
Stahleck Castle (Burg Stahleck)
Remnants of a Roman road up from Stahleck Castle
Stahlberg Castle (Burg Stahlberg) above Bacharach-Steeg
Blücher monument stone at the Rhine ferry

Bacharach in art
 Heinrich Heine: Der Rabbi von Bacherach  1840. Text at: , also a further 2 of Heine’s poems on the heritage theme
dsb., Gedicht "Ich weiß nicht, was soll es bedeuten..."  also a list of all together 9 musical versions of the Heine poem
 Clemens Brentano: Loreley-Gedicht: „Zu Bacharach am Rheine …“
 Gerd Hergen Lübben: „DER TEXTFUND ZU BACHERACH [VORSATZ / »VOM HEILIGEN WERNER UND POGROM IN BACHERACH AM RHEIN« / NACHKLANG]“. In: DIE BRÜCKE – Forum for antiracist politics and culture, Heft 140, 2/2006 (Saarbrücken), S. 126-128
 Guillaume Apollinaire: poem LA LORELEY In: Œuvres poétiques, Gallimard, Paris 1965, S. 115f, in German and French in:  S. 48f.- set to music by Dmitri Shostakovich

Regular events 

 Kulinarische Sommernacht (“Culinary Summer Night”, every fourth weekend in August)
 Boules tournament
 Tal to Tal – car-free adventure day, upper Rhine Gorge (every last Sunday in June)
 Vierthälermarkt – mediaeval market in Bacharach

Notable people 

 Gerhard von Kügelgen, (1772–1820), painter
 Karl von Kügelgen, (1772–1832), landscape and historical painter, Russian court and cabinet painter
 Hans Meinhard von Schönberg, (1582–1616), Electorate of the Palatinate and Electorate of Brandenburg field colonel (Feldobrister) and the Winter King’s Hofmeister

Gallery

Further reading 
 Friedrich Ludwig Wagner (publisher): Bacharach und die Geschichte der Viertälerorte: Bacharach, Steeg, Diebach und Manubach. Verein für die Geschichte der Stadt Bacharach und der Viertäler e.V., 1996.

Documents 
 Bild von Bacharach aus J.F. Dielmann, A. Fay, J. Becker (Zeichner): F.C. Vogels Panorama des Rheins, Bilder des rechten und linken Rheinufers, Lithographische Anstalt F.C. Vogel, Frankfurt 1833
 Bild 2 von Bacharach, dito
 Bild 3 von Bacharach, dito
 Bild der Burg Die Pfalz, dito

References

External links 

 Town’s official webpage
 Medieval Festival

Historic Jewish communities
Mainz-Bingen
Districts of the Rhine Province
Middle Rhine